Rally Round the Flag, Boys! is a 1958 American comedy film directed by Leo McCarey from a screenplay he co-wrote with Claude Binyon, based on the 1957 novel of the same name by Max Shulman. Released by 20th Century Fox, the film stars Paul Newman, Joanne Woodward, Joan Collins, and Jack Carson. The title comes from a line in the song "Battle Cry of Freedom".

Plot
In the fictional suburban commuter town of Putnam's Landing, Connecticut, public relations specialist Harry Bannerman is slowly going insane because his wife Grace insists on attending every local civic committee meeting. When the government selects the town for the site of a new missile base, Grace joins a committee to prevent it from being built.

Harry is made the liaison for the military, and Grace's activities cause him no end of trouble. Adding to the dilemma is Angela Hoffa, whose efforts to get Harry for herself lead to dizzying recriminations and misunderstandings.

Cast

Production
George Axelrod worked on the script for a year with McCarey. He later recalled they came up with an approach to do the film "but it was too far out for Buddy Adler", the head of production at Fox: 
Max Shulman's book was a very funny book, and very literary, in that he used literary devices – which don't often translate to the screen very well. The story itself was rather boring, but the author's comments were funny. So I invented a narrator, named Max, who wove the film together. It was a throwback to the old Pete Smith comedy shorts. But they hated the idea of narration – just as they hate the idea of fantasy – so they threw it out. And then I had to spend a lot of time getting my name off the picture, because I don't want my name on something I didn't write. 
Production on Rally Round the Flag, Boys! started in mid-June 1958 and ended in mid-August. The role of Captain Hoxie was originally going to be portrayed by Paul Douglas, but was taken over by Jack Carson after Douglas fell ill, according to a July 1958 The Hollywood Reporter news item.

The part of Angela was originally intended for actress Jayne Mansfield, but after intense lobbying from Paul Newman and his wife Joanne Woodward, she was replaced with Joan Collins (who had co-starred with Mansfield in The Wayward Bus).

A March 1958 item noted that actor Mickey Shaughnessy was set for a featured role; however, he did not appear in the film. A Daily Variety news item reported that in March 1958, Buddy Adler was set to produce the film, and was considering the film to star Frank Sinatra, Deborah Kerr, and William Holden.

Release
Rally Round the Flag, Boys! premiered in New York City theatres on December 23, 1958. It was released nationwide in February 1959.

Reception
On Rotten Tomatoes, the film holds an approval rating of 30% based on reviews from 10 critics, with an average rating of 5/10.

Awards
Rally Round the Flag, Boys! was nominated for the Golden Laurel Awards held on September 23, 1959, and received fourth place for both Top Comedy Female Performance (Joanne Woodward) and Top Comedy. Director Leo McCarey was later nominated for the Directors Guild of America Award in 1960 for Outstanding Directorial Achievement in Motion Pictures for Rally Round the Flag, Boys!.

References

External links
 
 
 
 

1958 films
1958 comedy films
1950s American films
1950s English-language films
1950s satirical films
20th Century Fox films
American comedy films
American satirical films
CinemaScope films
Films based on American novels
Films directed by Leo McCarey
Films scored by Cyril J. Mockridge
Films set in Connecticut
Independence Day (United States) films